is a former Japanese football player.

Playing career
Onishi was born in Ehime Prefecture on October 16, 1971. After graduating from Fukuoka University, he joined Sanfrecce Hiroshima in 1994. Although he debuted and played many matches in 1995, he could not play at all in the match in 1996. In 1997, he moved to Kyoto Purple Sanga. However he could hardly play in the match. In 1998, he moved to his local club Ehime FC in Regional Leagues. The club was promoted to Japan Football League from 2001. From 2001, he also served as manager. He retired end of 2002 season.

Coaching career
In 2001, when Onishi played for Ehime FC, he became a playing manager. He managed the club until 2004.

Club statistics

References

External links

biglobe.ne.jp

1971 births
Living people
Fukuoka University alumni
Association football people from Ehime Prefecture
Japanese footballers
J1 League players
Japan Football League players
Sanfrecce Hiroshima players
Kyoto Sanga FC players
Ehime FC players
Japanese football managers
Ehime FC managers
Association football defenders